The Supreme Court of Judicature Act 1902 (2 Edw 7 c 31) was an Act of the Parliament of the United Kingdom.

It was one of the Judicature Acts 1873 to 1902 and the Judicature Acts 1873 to 1910.

Section 1 substituted the words "three divisions" for the words "two divisions" in section 12 of the Supreme Court of Judicature Act 1875.

See also
Supreme Court of Judicature Act

References
The Public General Acts passed in the Second Year of the Reign of His Majesty King Edward the Seventh. Printed for HMSO by the King's Printer. London. 1902. Page 73.

United Kingdom Acts of Parliament 1902